Hassel is a small town in the commune of Weiler-la-Tour, in southern Luxembourg.  , the town has a population of 428.  It is the administrative centre of Weiler-la-Tour commune.

Luxembourg (canton)
Towns in Luxembourg